An album is a collection of audio and video recordings.

Album may also refer to:

Music
 Album – Generic Flipper, by the band Flipper
 Album (Girls album)
 Album (Joan Jett album)
 Álbum (Lu album)
 Album (Dave Pike Set album)
 Album (Public Image Ltd. album)
 Album (Quorthon album)
 Album (Ghali album)

Film and television
 Album (2002 film), a 2002 Indian film
 Album (2016 film), a 2016 Turkish film
 "Album" (Land of the Lost), a television episode

Other uses
 Album (Ancient Rome), a board chalked or painted white, on which public notices were inscribed in black.
 Album (magazine), a photography magazine
 Autograph book, a book in which autographs are kept
 Comics album, a common format for publishing Franco-Belgian comics
 Confession album, used to record the opinions of friends
 Muraqqa, containing Islamic miniature paintings and calligraphy
 Photo album, a book of related photographs
 Stamp album, a book in which a collection of postage stamps may be stored and displayed
 Sticker album, a book in which a collection of stickers may be stored and displayed

See also
 The Album (disambiguation)
 Alba (disambiguation)
 Albus (disambiguation)
C. album (disambiguation)
V. album (disambiguation)